Max Lambert (born 1955) is an Australian composer and musical director.

Biography
Born in 1923 in Sydney, he studied at the Sydney Conservatorium of Music.

Lambert composed the musicals Darlinghurst Nights and Miracle City, both first produced by the Sydney Theatre Company. With Iva Davies, he composed Berlin for the Sydney Dance Company in 1995. He was the musical director for the original production of The Boy from Oz, for which he received the inaugural Helpmann Award for Best Musical Direction in 2001.

He was the musical director for the Opening and Closing Ceremonies of the 2000 Olympic Games in Sydney, and worked on the Commonwealth Games in Manchester.

References

Australian musical theatre composers
Helpmann Award winners
1955 births
Living people